Area 9 can refer to:

 Area 9 (Nevada National Security Site)
 Brodmann area 9